The Friars are coached by Bob Deraney. Assisting Deraney are Bob Bellemore, Meredith Roth, and Amy Quinlan.

Offseason
July 16: Former Providence College women's hockey player Karen Thatcher is one of 41 players selected to participate in the 2009 USA Hockey Women's National Festival. The Festival will take place August 18–24 in Blaine, Minnesota. The Festival will serve as the selection camp for the 2009-10 U.S. Women's National Team that will compete in the Qwest Tour. The tour is a 10-game domestic tour that begins September 25 and ends just prior to the start of the 2010 Olympic Winter Games.
July 17: Providence College hockey sophomore Genevieve Lacasse was one of 42 players selected to Canada's National Women's Under-22 Camp. The camp took place on August 6–14 in Calgary, Alberta. The camp will determine the selections for the National Women's Under-22 Team for the 2009-10 season. Lacasse finished her first season as a goaltender at Providence. Lacasse finished with a 15-11-1 record to go along with a 1.94 goals against average and a .933 save percentage.

Exhibition

Regular season
Oct. 2: Freshman Jessica Cohen scored her first-career goal in the 4-0 victory against Maine, and it was also the game-winning goal.
October: Jessica Cohen finished the month of October with three goals and three assists for six points, the second-highest mark on the team. She recorded two points (1g, 1a) in the first game of her career in Providence's 4-0 victory over Maine on Oct. 2. Of her three goals, two have been game-winners (10/2 vs. Maine, 10/16 vs. Colgate).
December: Genevieve Lacasse finished the month with a 1-0-1 record based on a 1.44 GAA and a .940 save percentage. Lacasse made 22 saves in a 4-1 victory over No. 3 New Hampshire, handing the Wildcats their first ever conference loss at the Whittemore Center on December 5. Lacasse finished out the month with 25 saves in a 2-2 tie against Boston College on December 11.
December 5: Genevieve Lacasse of Providence made 22 saves in a 4-1 victory as the Wildcats suffered their first ever conference loss at the Whittemore Center.
December 18: Former Friar women's hockey star Karen Thatcher was one of 21 players selected to the 2009-10 U.S. Olympic Team.
January 9: Providence College women's hockey earned their 600th victory by defeating No. 8 Cornell by a score of 6-3. Junior Jean O'Neill tallied a goal and an assist. Genevieve Lacasse made 22 saves to record the victory. Providence now joins New Hampshire as the only two programs with 600 victories.
January: Jean O’Neill led Providence College to a 7-2-1 record finishing the month with 13 points on seven goals, which included two game-winning goals and six assists. O’Neill registered nine points (4 goals, 5 assists) in four games against ranked teams. This included two goals and an assist in a 3-2 victory at No. 3 New Hampshire on January 16. She tallied an eight-game point streak from Jan. 3 to Jan. 29, which included three multi-point games during the streak.
January 14: It was announced that the grand opening of the Bill and Emily Leary Friends of Friar Hockey Room was set for Sunday, January 17.
February 9: Head Coach Bob Deraney announced the signing of five players for the class of 2014. The signees include Corinne Buie (Edina, Minn.), Stephanie Demars (Vermontville, N.Y.), Rebecca Morse (Westfield, N.J.), Maggie Pendleton (Woodbury, Minn.) and Nina Riley (Lexington, Mass.) for the 2010-11 season.

Standings

Roster

Schedule

Player stats

Skaters

Goaltenders

Awards and honors
Jessica Cohen, Rookie of the Week (Week of October 5)
 Jessica Cohen, Bauer Rookie of the Month, of the Month, October 2009
 Ashley Cottrell, New England Hockey Writers All-Star Team
 Bob Deraney, Hockey East Coach of the Year
 Genevieve Lacasse, Bauer Goaltender of the Month, December 2009
 Genevieve Lacasse, Hockey East Co-Defensive Player of the Week(Week of January 11)
 Jean O’Neill, WHEA Player of the Month, January 2010
 Alyse Ruff, Hockey East Player of the Week (Week of January 25)
 Amber Yung, Runner up, Best Defenseman Award
 Amber Yung, New England Hockey Writers All-Star Team

All Hockey East team
 Ashley Cottrell, 2010 WHEA First-Team All-Star
 Genevieve Lacasse, 2010 WHEA Second-Team All-Star
 Jean O’Neill, 2010 WHEA Second-Team All-Star
 Alyse Ruff, 2010 WHEA Honorable Mention All-Star
 Amber Yung, Genevieve Lacasse, 2010 WHEA Second-Team All-Star

References

External links
Official site

Providence
Providence Friars women's ice hockey seasons
Providence
Providence